Asive Langwe (born 20 June 1993) is a South African football (soccer) midfielder for Premier Soccer League club Bidvest Wits.

References

1993 births
Living people
People from Nyandeni Local Municipality
South African soccer players
Xhosa people
Association football midfielders
Bidvest Wits F.C. players
F.C. AK players